Henry John Bacon Woods (October 20, 1842 – September 1, 1914) was a merchant and political figure in Newfoundland. He represented Bay de Verde from 1889 to 1894, from 1895 to 1897 and from 1900 to 1902.

He was born in St. John's, the son of John Woods and Anne Woods (Lang). His father, John Woods, was the owner of John Woods & Son where Henry started his career along with his brother Sidney. Henry married Hannah Louisa (Bemister) in 1870. Woods was unseated by petition in 1894 and was replaced by his brother Sidney in the assembly, then reelected in 1895. He was defeated when he ran for reelection in 1897. He served in the Executive Council as surveyor general from 1889 to 1894 and from 1895 to 1897 and as a minister without portfolio from 1900 to 1902. Woods resigned from the assembly in 1902 after he was named Postmaster General of Newfoundland and served until his death in St. John's at the age of 71.

His daughter Mabel was the mother of Harry Mews, a long-time mayor of St. John's.

References 
 

Members of the Newfoundland and Labrador House of Assembly
1842 births
1914 deaths
Politicians from St. John's, Newfoundland and Labrador
Postmasters General of Newfoundland
Newfoundland Colony people
Dominion of Newfoundland people